Federico Lacroze  is an underground station on Line B of the Buenos Aires Underground named after the Argentine railway entrepreneur, located at the intersection of Corrientes and Federico Lacroze avenues in the Chacarita neighbourhood and near the La Chacarita Cemetery. The station was opened on 17 October 1930 as the western terminus of the extension of the line from Federico Lacroze to Callao.

It was a terminal station of line B from its inauguration and the inauguration of the extension to the Incas station on 9 August 2003.

This station has connection to Federico Lacroze railway station, the central station of the General Urquiza Railway and terminus of the  Urquiza Line suburban electric commuter line operated by the underground operator Metrovías.

History 
Originally, the underground station was intended to be the central terminal for Federico Lacroze's Buenos Aires Central Railway, however years later when construction of Line B began, it became an underground station. When the Federico Lacroze railway station was built, the Urquiza Line and General Urquiza Railway were moved permanently above ground.

Gallery

Nearby
 La Chacarita Cemetery
 Federico Lacroze railway station

References

External links 

 Subterráneos de Buenos Aires (Official Page) Federico Lacroze Underground Station

Buenos Aires Underground stations
Railway stations opened in 1930
1930 establishments in Argentina